Tracy Langlands (born 26 April 1970 in Lincoln, England) is a British rower. Langlands won the bronze medal in the Lightweight Women's Double Sculls at the 2002 World Championships. She competed in the same event with Helen Casey at the 2004 Olympics.

References

External links
 

1970 births
Living people
English female rowers
British female rowers
Sportspeople from Lincoln, England
Rowers at the 2004 Summer Olympics
Olympic rowers of Great Britain
Durham University Boat Club rowers
World Rowing Championships medalists for Great Britain
Alumni of St Mary's College, Durham